Ralph Banks (1920–1993) was an English footballer.

Ralph Banks or Bankes may also refer to:

Ralph Bankes (1631–1677), courtier of Charles II and MP for Corfe Castle
Ralph Richard Banks (born 1964), American professor